Paraburkholderia symbiotica is a gram-negative, catalase and oxidase-positive, aerobic, non-spore-forming, non-motile bacterium from the genus Paraburkholderia and the family Burkholderiaceae which was isolated from root nodules of a Mimosa in north east Brazil.

References

symbiotica
Bacteria described in 2012